Valley Rangers Football Club is a Northern Irish intermediate football club based in Kilkeel, County Down, playing in Intermediate Division A of the Mid-Ulster Football League. The club was founded in 1973. Club colours are blue, white and red.

The club participates in the Irish Cup.

Honours 
Intermediate B

2014/15   Champions

Marshall Cup

2015/16 Champions

Premier Cup

2016/17 Champions

References

 

Association football clubs in Northern Ireland
Association football clubs in County Down
Mid-Ulster Football League clubs
Association football clubs established in 1973
1973 establishments in Northern Ireland